Siniša Zlatković (born 28 January 1924, date of death 5 april 1996) was a Serbian football defender who was a member of the Yugoslavia national team at the 1950 FIFA World Cup. However, he never earned a cap for his country. He also played for Red Star Belgrade. Zlatković is deceased.

References

External links
FIFA profile

1924 births
Year of death missing
Yugoslav footballers
Serbian footballers
Association football defenders
1950 FIFA World Cup players
Yugoslav First League players
FK Naša Krila Zemun players
Red Star Belgrade footballers
Sportspeople from Smederevo